Alexandru Mațiura (born 24 October 1954) is a Moldovan professional football manager and a former player.

Honours
Coach of the year in Moldova (1): 2001

External links
 

1954 births
Living people
Soviet footballers
Moldovan footballers
FC Zimbru Chișinău players
CSF Bălți managers
Moldovan football managers
FC Nistru Otaci managers
CSF Bălți players
Association football midfielders
People from Edineț District
Moldova national football team managers
Moldovan Super Liga managers